Edwin Alexander Rodríguez Castillo (born 25 September 1999) is a Honduran professional footballer who plays as a wide midfielder for Olimpia and the Honduras national team.

Career

Aris
On 14 September 2022, Aris officially announced the signing of Rodríguez on a season-long loan with a purchase option of €1,000,000 for the summer of 2023.

Career statistics

Club

Notes

International

Honours
Individual
CONCACAF Champions League Team of the Tournament: 2020
CONCACAF Men's Olympic Qualifying Tournament Best XI: 2020
CONCACAF Nations League Finals Best XI: 2021

References

Living people
1999 births
Honduran footballers
Honduran expatriate footballers
Honduran expatriate sportspeople
Honduran expatriate sportspeople in Greece
Expatriate footballers in Greece
Honduras youth international footballers
Honduras international footballers
Association football midfielders
Liga Nacional de Fútbol Profesional de Honduras players
Super League Greece players
C.D. Olimpia players
Aris Thessaloniki F.C. players
People from Santa Bárbara Department, Honduras
Footballers at the 2020 Summer Olympics
Olympic footballers of Honduras